The 1997 season of the 3. divisjon, the fourth highest association football league for men in Norway.

Between 20 and 24 games (depending on group size) were played in 19 groups, with 3 points given for wins and 1 for draws. All group winners were promoted to the 2. divisjon, as well as some of the best runners-up.

Tables 

Group 1
Bjerke – promoted
Rælingen
Hafslund
Torp
Lisleby
Ullensaker/Kisa
Greåker
Drøbak/Frogn 2 – relegated
Skjetten 2
Sørumsand – relegated
Aurskog/Finstadbru – relegated
Nittedal – relegated

Group 2
Rakkestad – promoted
Skeid 2
Kvik Halden
Trøgstad/Båstad
Moss 2
Nordby
Kolbotn
Rygge
Tune
Vestby – relegated
Nesodden – relegated
Hærland – relegated

Group 3
Vålerenga 2 – promoted
Brandval
Grue
Fart
Kongsvinger 2
Vang
Kjellmyra
Manglerud Star
Gjelleråsen
Grorud – relegated
Oppsal – relegated
Stange – relegated

Group 4
Nybergsund – promoted
Vardal
Vinstra
Trysil
Kolbu/KK
Lillehammer FK
Toten
Sel
Follebu
Nordre Land – relegated
Vind – relegated
Ringsaker – relegated

Group 5
Stabæk 2 – promoted
Lyn 2 – promoted
Asker
Flint
Teie
Holmen
Fram
Fagerborg
Borre
Fevang – relegated
KFUM – relegated
Tjølling – relegated

Group 6
Drafn – promoted
Skarphedin
Birkebeineren
Slemmestad (-> Slemmestad/Bødalen)
Storm
Snøgg
Skotfoss
Åmot
Rjukan
Tønsberg FK – relegated
Urædd – relegated
Solberg – relegated

Group 7
Mandalskameratene – promoted
Tollnes
Lyngdal
Kvinesdal
Randesund
Grim/Start 2
Våg
Langesund
Sørfjell
Donn – relegated
Øyestad – relegated
Kragerø – relegated

Group 8
Klepp – promoted
Bryne 2
Rosseland
Hana
Hundvåg
Figgjo
Varhaug
Egersund
Nærbø
Buøy – relegated
Staal – relegated
Sokndal – relegated
Stavanger – relegated

Group 9
Haugesund 2 – promoted
Sandnes – promoted
Nord
Åkra
Odda
Grannekameratene
Bremnes
Skjold
Kjøkkelvik
Djerv 1919 – relegated
Solid – relegated
Avaldsnes – relegated

Group 10
Os – promoted
Ny-Krohnborg
Kleppestø
Vadmyra
Follese
Radøy
Florvåg
Bjørnar
Nymark
Hovding – relegated
Bergen Sparta – relegated
Kalandseid – relegated
Austrheim – relegated

Group 11
Jotun – promoted
Sogndal 2 – promoted
Tornado
Sandane
Florø
Dale
Fjøra
Eid
Eikefjord
Høyang
Jølster
Anga

Group 12
Aalesund 2 – promoted
Velledalen og Ringen
Spjelkavik
Hødd 2
Langevåg
Bergsøy
Brattvåg
Stranda
Hareid
Valder
Aksla – relegated
Herd – relegated

Group 13
Clausenengen – promoted
Kristiansund – promoted
Bryn
Ekko/Aureosen
Søya
Kvass/Ulvungen
Sunndal
Tomrefjord – relegated
Bøfjord
Surnadal
Isfjorden
Bud

Group 14
Orkdal – promoted
Singsås
Tynset
NTHI
Løkken
Røros
KIL/Hemne
Heimdal
Strindheim 2 – relegated
Hitra – relegated
Leinstrand – relegated
Brekken – relegated

Group 15
Bangsund – promoted
Tiller
Melhus
Kvamskameratene
Fram
Levanger
Tranabakkan
Verdal 2
Vinne
Vanvik – relegated
Steinkjer 2 – relegated
Fosen – relegated

Group 16
Bodø/Glimt 2 – promoted
Saltdalkameratene
Brønnøysund
Nesna
Sørfold
Stålkameratene 2
Korgen
Nedre Beiarn – relegated
Nordre Meløy
Sømna (-> Sømna/Tjalg)
Grand Bodø – relegated

Group 17
Morild – promoted
Landsås
Flakstad
Vågakameratene
Medkila
Leknes
Skånland
Grovfjord
Stokmarknes – relegated
Beisfjord
Andenes – relegated
Kvæfjord – relegated

Group 18
Lyngen/Karnes – promoted
Ulfstind – promoted
Nordreisa
Skarp
Salangen
Balsfjord (-> Nordkjosbotn/Balsfjord)
Ramfjord
Bardu
Tromsdalen 2
Sørreisa – relegated
Pioner – relegated
Storfjord – relegated

Group 19
Hammerfest – promoted
Kirkenes
Kautokeino
Honningsvåg
Sørøy Glimt
Nordkinn
Bossekop
Alta 2 – relegated
Golnes – relegated
Bjørnevatn
Lakselv
Nordlys

References

Norwegian Third Division seasons
4
Norway
Norway